Alikhan Maksudovich Ramazanov (born 31 August 1976) is a former Russian professional football player.

Club career
He made his Russian Football National League debut for FC Anzhi Makhachkala on 22 April 1997 in a game against FC Gazovik-Gazprom Izhevsk. He played 4 seasons in the FNL in his career.

See also
Football in Russia

References

External links
 
 Profile by Sportbox.ru

1976 births
Living people
Russian footballers
Association football defenders
FC Anzhi Makhachkala players
PFC Spartak Nalchik players
FC SKA Rostov-on-Don players
FC Akhmat Grozny players
FC Spartak-UGP Anapa players
FC Angusht Nazran players
FC Nika Krasny Sulin players